Theodore Braybrooke Panabokke (11 May 1909 – 1989) was Sri Lankan politician, lawyer and diplomat. He was a former Parliamentary Secretary of Agriculture, Member of Parliament and Ceylon's High Commissioner to India. He was the Chancellor of the University of Peradeniya.

Early life and education
Theodore Braybrooke Panabokke was born on 11 May 1909, the eldest son of Sir Tikiri Bandara Panabokke Adigar, first Minister of Health in the State Council of Ceylon and Mantri Kumarihamy Keppetipola. He was educated at Royal College Colombo and at the Colombo Law College. As his father, he became a Proctor and practiced in Gampola.

Political career
In 1947 he successfully contested the first parliamentary elections as a representative of United National Party in the Galaha electorate. He received 7,638 votes (28% of the total vote) defeating five other candidates. At the 2nd parliamentary election, held in May 1952, he retained his seat, defeating Piyasena Tennakoon by 4,606 votes (securing 48% of the total vote). He was a Member of Parliament from 1947 to 1956 and held the post of Parliamentary secretary to the Minister of Justice in the first Dudley Senanayake cabinet and Parliamentary secretary to the Minister of Agriculture and Food in the Kotelawala cabinet. During this time he was a member of the Kandyan Peasantry Commission and was appointed as  Chairman of the People’s Bank in 1965. He failed to get re-elected at the 3rd parliamentary election held in April 1956, where he was defeated by the Sri Lanka Freedom Party nominee, T. B. Ilangaratne, 6,434 votes, only receiving 38% of the total vote, as opposed to Ilangaratne's 61%.

From 1976 to 1977 he was the Chairman of the Board of Directors of the Sri Lanka Freedom from Hunger Campaign. In 1978 he was appointed High Commissioner to India and served till 1982, thus becoming the only father son pair to hold the post. From 1984 to 1986 he was Chairman of the Nation Builders’ Association.

He was appointed Chancellor of the University of Peradeniya in 1984 and held office until his death in 1989.

Family
Panabokke married Somawathie Nugapitiya, daughter of Kuda Banda Nugapitiya in 1939 and had two daughters. His home was Elpitiya Walauwa in Gampola.

See also
Sri Lankan Non Career Diplomats

References

1909 births
1989 deaths
Sinhalese lawyers
Ceylonese proctors
Alumni of Royal College, Colombo
Parliamentary secretaries of Ceylon
Members of the 1st Parliament of Ceylon
Members of the 2nd Parliament of Ceylon
High Commissioners of Sri Lanka to India